Parking is a French fantasy and musical film from 1985. It was directed and written by Jacques Demy, starring Francis Huster, Laurent Malet, and Jean Marais.

Synopsis
The Orpheus myth repeats itself in the 20th century, paying tribute to Jean Cocteau's film classic Orphée (1950) by having the actor who played Orpheus appear as Hades.

Orpheus is a famous pop singer who composes love songs for Eurydice, his wife and sculptress who also designs his album covers; together they live alongside Aristée, his manager, and Calaïs, his sound engineer and lover, in a castle. During one of his concerts, an electrical malfunction briefly kills him and sends him to the Underworld, represented by a metro station and parking garage. Orpheus meets Charon, Hades, and Persephone, who agree to send him back to Earth as long as he doesn't reveal what he sees. Back on Earth, Persephone being sent to spy on Orpheus causes rifts between him and his lovers, as Calaïs admits to being jealous of Eurydice while Eurydice feels threatened by Persephone's attention. Meanwhile, Eurydice trades Orpheus concert tickets in exchange for drugs supplied by Dominique Daniel, leader of the Bacchantes; Eurydice and Orpheus have a violent argument over her drug usage and she refuses to attend his upcoming concert as a result.

As Orpheus wrestles with his lost muse and additional love for Calaïs, he finds that Eurydice has died of a drug overdose during his show. After failed attempts to get to the Underworld on his own, Persephone takes Orpheus to a cemetery to descend to the Underworld and ask for Eurydice back. Hades agrees, but imposes the condition that he not look at Eurydice until they've both reached the exit; to circumvent this, Orpheus ties her tourniquet around his eyes. Eurydice stops for a break and they make love at one of Hades' motels. As the walk continues, Orpheus removes the tourniquet to avoid falling, but a speeding car makes him turn around and lose Eurydice, sending him back to Earth. At his final showstopping performance, dedicated to Eurydice, he is murdered by Dominique Daniel, who was denied his concert tickets. Orpheus reunites with his wife in death.

Cast 
 Francis Huster as Orpheus
 Laurent Malet as Calaïs
 Keiko Itô as Eurydice
 Gérard Klein as Aristée
 Marie-France Pisier as Claude Perséphone
 Jean Marais as Hades
 Hugues Quester as Caron
 Éva Darlan as Dominique Daniel
 Annick Alane as Luciennne
 Marion Game as the costumer
 Jean Amos as Clément

References

External links 
 
 
 
 Parking (1985) at Films de France

1985 fantasy films
1985 films
Films directed by Jacques Demy
French drama films
French fantasy films
1980s musical drama films
1985 romantic drama films
1980s French-language films
1980s romantic musical films
Films scored by Michel Legrand
Orpheus
1980s French films